El Cid Castle was a landmark structure located on the opposite side of the western boundary of Sunnyslope, Arizona. The controversial castle, built by the late Dr. Kenneth Hall, was supposed to be a bowling alley which resembled a Moorish Castle. Construction on the structure began in 1963 and was completed in 1980.

History

Dr. Kenneth E. Hall
Dr. Kenneth E. Hall was born in Oklahoma. During World War II, Hall enlisted in the U.S. Army, graduated from the University of Arkansas Medical School, and was honorably discharged after a brief deployment to Italy in 1945. In 1948, he moved with his family to Phoenix, Arizona. Dr. Hall established clinics in South Phoenix and Sunnyslope (Sunnyslope was not part of Phoenix at the time).
Dr. Hall wanted to be known as the “King of Sunnyslope” and built the biggest house in Sunnyslope.  Sunnyslope had attempted to be incorporated as its own town on four occasions but failed every time. In 1959, the City of Phoenix annexed the community of Sunnyslope. By then, Dr. Hall operated the North Mountain Hospital, a 40-bed hospital in Sunnyslope, which he built in 1955. The hospital had a primate zoo located on the hospital grounds.

El Cid Castle
Dr. Hall felt that the growing population of Sunnyslope needed recreational facilities and therefore in 1963, he illegally diverted $16,564 in Medicare funds to help in the construction of a bowling alley which resembled a Moorish Castle. The castle was to be a 65,000-square-foot building under one roof in 20 acres of land at 19th Avenue and Cholla Street.
The venture was to include thirty-two bowling alley lanes, an ice skating rink, four recreation rooms for teenagers and a snack bar. The castle was also supposed to include multiple nightclubs and a French restaurant. It was named "El Cid", after an 11th-century Spanish hero whose life was depicted in a Hollywood motion picture in 1961.

Downfall of Dr. Hall and closure of El Cid Castle
Dr. Hall believed that El Cid Castle would be the first of a nationwide chain of bowling allies which would be called Spanish Trails. However, the castle was completed in 1980, almost twenty years after its construction began. Various factors contributed to the downfall of Dr. Hall and the eventual failure of El Cid. Dr. Hall had been performing unsanctioned medical operations, and his physician’s license was revoked in 1971 after four patients died during gastric bypass surgery. In 1974, he pleaded guilty to diverting thousands of dollars in Medicare funds to help build the castle. Dr. Hall was bankrupt, and in 1982 “El Cid Castle” bowling alley closed after one year of operation. Dr. Hall lost the building in order to settle a malpractice suit.

Later years
Dr. Hall died in 2001, at age 80, of heart failure. The building later served as a furniture store, an educational facility, church and a sports club. The structure, which was empty for sometime, was purchased by the State of Arizona for a new Department of Economic Security office complex. It was remodeled and no longer looks like a castle. In January 2015, the Arizona Department of Economic Security opened the doors of its new facility.

Historic “El Cid Castle”
The historic "El Cid Castle" was a bowling alley which resembled a Moorish Castle. It was built by the late Dr. Kenneth Hall, a physician who served the Community of Sunnyslope in Phoenix. Construction on the structure began in 1963 and was completed in 1980. It is located at the Northwest corner of 19th Ave and West Cholla Drive which technically is on the opposite side Sunnyslope's western boundary.

Further reading
 Sunnyslope (Images of America), by Reba Wells Grandrud; Arcadia Publishing (2013);

See also

 List of historic properties in Phoenix, Arizona
 Sunnyslope, Arizona
 Other uses of the term El Cid

Other historic structures in Phoenix
 Smurthwaite House
 Windsor Hotel
 Squaw Peak Inn
 Tovrea Castle
 Mystery Castle

References

External links
 Sunnyslope History from the Sunnyslope Historical Society and Museum
 Historical Timeline of Sunnyslope by John C. Lincoln Health Network
 There's No Place Like Sunnyslope by The Modern Phoenix Neighborhood Network

History of Phoenix, Arizona
Buildings and structures in Phoenix, Arizona
Buildings and structures completed in 1980